SBWR may refer to:
 Simplified Boiling Water Reactor, a nuclear reactor design by General Electric
 Sungei Buloh Wetland Reserve